Matteo Cavagna (born 13 January 1984) is an Italian footballer who plays as a winger.

Career
Born in Bergamo, Lombardy, Cavagna started his career at A.C. Milan, played at their Primavera U20 Youth Team in 2002–03 season. He then played two season at Serie D clubs Foligno and Oggiono. In 2005-06 season, he was re-signed by Foligno, which promoted to Serie C2. In January 2007, he joined Serie B side Arezzo in a co-ownership deal. He followed the team relegated to Serie C1, and in June 2009 bought back by Foligno, which the team at that time at Lega Pro Prima Divisione (ex-Serie C1). In October 2009, he extended his contract, which lasted until 30 June 2012. He was the joint-topscorer of the team along with Stefano Giacomelli in 2009–10 Lega Pro Prima Divisione season.

Honours
Foligno
Serie C2: 2006–07

References

External links
 Profile at AIC.Football.it 
 Profile at La Gazzetta dello Sport 2006-07 

Italian footballers
A.C. Milan players
A.S.D. Città di Foligno 1928 players
S.S. Arezzo players
Serie B players
Serie C players
Serie D players
Association football midfielders
Footballers from Bergamo
1984 births
Living people